The Trump Oil Corporation was a Vancouver-based company owned by former US President Donald Trump during his business career.

Background

The company was initially created on 31 August 1995 as Visioneering Corporation, then changed to Asiamerica Energy Corporation on 12 January 1996, Care Financial Corporation on 29 April 1996, and became Trump Oil Corporation on 15 May 1997.

In October 1996, the Trump Oil Corporation acquired Care Concepts, a Nevada company specialized in wheelchair-accessible minivans.

In August 1997, Trump Oil abandoned a deal for sapphires, emeralds and gold in Madagascar. Patrick Leloup, the first person to obtain an emerald exploitation licence in Madagascar, was a consultant for the Trump Oil Corporation.

In February 1998, Trump Oil was preparing a takeover of Fenway Resources, after Donald Trump was introduced to Fenway by Ranbir "Ron" Singh Dhaliwa. The Vancouver Stock Exchange red-flagged the deal because of two controversial intermediaries, Lucky Janda and Gerry Sklar. The British Columbia Securities Commission provided the following information after investigating the Trump Oil Corporation: While the company was set up in Nevada in 1995, its headquarters and directors were all based in British Columbia. Before making an offer to purchase Fenway with Trump Oil shares in 1998, the commission identified a grey area between 1997 and 1998 where the value of the Trump Oil shares were inflated by way of unreported transfers and over-the-counter trades through the bulletin board of the NASD, which led to a market valuation of $32,593,814 as of 13 January 1998. Then on 14 January 1998, the Trump Oil Corporation made an offer to purchase Fenway with the now inflated Trump shares. However, Trump Oil Corporation's financial statement for 1997, which described the corporation as «a holding company for future subsidiary acquisitions», showed that the company held only $4,526 in assets and had no income. The Fenway deal was giving a pro forma financial stake of $14,423,790 to the Trump Oil Corporation in the Palawan exploitation rights held by Fenway.

In 1999, the Trump Oil Corporation reported $2,500 in sales, and around $20,000 in losses.

In 1999, the Trump Oil Corporation acquired the Colorado-based company 20/20 Web Design owned by Crown Partners, issuing 8,620,000 shares (80% of total shares) to the latter under a ten-for-one reverse stock split deal. Another report states that the 20/20 Web Design company was based in Nevada. After the merger, Trump Oil Corporation changed its name to 20/20 Web Design and was merged with Colorado-based Multi-Source Capital Ltd., acquired in April 1999 by Stein's Holdings Inc.

Related pages
Business career of Donald Trump

References

Business career of Donald Trump
Companies based in Vancouver
Canadian companies established in 1995
Oil companies of Canada
Energy companies established in 1995